Resident. Two Years of Oakenfold at Cream. is a DJ mix album by Paul Oakenfold.

Critical reception 

Jason Birchmeier of Allmusic rated the album four stars out of five, saying "Practically every track Oakenfold drops is an anthem, having been spun a million nights over, from London to Ibiza to Miami. A picture-perfect snapshot of a memorable moment in dance-music history."

Track listing

Disc 1
 Y-Traxx - "Mystery Land" (Original Mix)
 Tilt - "Butterfly" (Tilt's Mechanism Mix)
 Armin van Buuren - "Blue Fear" (Extended Mix)
 Space Brothers - "Shine" (Full Vocal)
 Ascension - "Someone" (Original Vocal Mix)
 Brainbug - "Nightmare" (Sinister Strings Mix)
 Three 'N' One - "Sin City" (Original Mix)
 Underworld - "Dark and Long (Dark Train)" (Original Mix)
 B.B.E. - "Flash" (Club Mix)
 LSG - "Netherworld" (Vinyl Cut)
 Transa - "Prophase" (X-Cabs Remix One)
 Man With No Name - "Vavoom!" (Original Mix)
 Mystica "Ever Rest" (Mystica Mix)
 C.J. Bolland - "The Prophet" (Original Mix)

Disc 2
 Taste Xperience feat. Natasha Pearl - "Summersault" (Original Mix)
 Mansun - "Wide Open Space" (Perfecto Mix)
 Tilt vs. Paul van Dyk - "Rendezvous" (Quadraphonic Mix)
 Stone Proof - "Everything's Not You" (Quivver's Space Edit)
 Tilt - "Children" (Tilt's Courtyard Mix)
 Freefall feat. Jan Johnston - "Skydive" (Original Mix)
 Push - "Universal Nation" (Original Mix)
 Amoeba Asassin - "Rollercoaster" (Oakey's Courtyard Mix)
 Planet Heaven - "Nautical Bodies" (Original Mix)
 Groovezone - "Eisbaer" (Soul Hooligan Radio Edit)
 C.M. - "Dream Universe" (Original Mix)
 Agnelli and Nelson - "El Nino" (Matt Darey Mix)
 Tekara feat. Lucy Cotter - "Breathe in You" (Tekara's M and M Dub)
 Transa - "Enervate" (Original Mix)

References 

Paul Oakenfold remix albums
1999 remix albums